Czółna  is a village in the administrative district of Gmina Niedrzwica Duża, within Lublin County, Lublin Voivodeship, in eastern Poland.

The village has an approximate population of 430.

References

Villages in Lublin County